The Noel Besi River is a river flowing in the west part of Timor island and forms part of the border between the East Timor exclave of Oecussi and Indonesian West Timor. It flows north into the Sawu Sea. Located 1900 km east of the Indonesian capital, Jakarta.

Hydrology 
The river rises in the mountains of West Timor as Oelvab. It is formed from several tributaries, the longest and southernmost rises to about 820 m in height. After the merging of the tributaries, the river winds north through the mountains. Below the Kali Aplal the Oelvab continues to flow towards the northeast, where after a few kilometers it merges with two other rivers. As soon as it reaches the East Timorese Suco Malelat, it forms the border between Indonesia and East Timor.

From Suco Malelat, the river now called Rio Kusi flows in northwest direction along the border of the Sucos Banafi and Lela-Ufe, before reaching the Suco Usi-Taco. The river bends sharply to southwest and flows along the border of Suco Beneufe. Just south of the village Lamasi it bends again to the northwest. The river now widens, forming river islands and tributaries. Just south of the village Naktuka the river splits. While the left arm, forming several lakes, flows further northwest to Sawu Sea, the right arm bends to the northeast. Both arms are crossed by the northern coastal road, with two bridges over the right arm. This arm flows between Oehoso and Manan on the right side and Naktuka on the left, forming more river islands and several tributaries, and also flows into the Sawu Sea a little later

Geography 

The river flows in the northwest part of Timor with predominantly tropical savanna climate (designated as Aw in the Köppen-Geiger climate classification). The annual average temperature in the area is 24 °C. The warmest month is October, when the average temperature is around 28 °C, and the coldest is February, at 22 °C. The average annual rainfall is 1621 mm. The wettest month is January, with an average of 331 mm rainfall, and the driest is August, with 7 mm rainfall.

Border 

The Noel Besi forms the "Noel Besi-Citrana border" area between Kupang Regency, East Nusa Tenggara, Indonesia, and Ambeno Regency, which belongs to East Timor. This area is watered Noel Besi river which discharges into Ombai Strait. In the period of Portuguese colonization, the river flowed on the east side of the disputed area, but due to the natural climate change, the river shifted to the right side of the disputed area, which has now become a fertile agricultural heritage land with the current Noel Besi river.

The small village Naktuka is in the eastern part of administrative village Netemnanu, District of Amfoang, Kupang Regency, and located exactly on the border between Indonesia and East Timor. Now the area of 1,069 hectare has a "free zone" status, cannot be entered by population of both country, although historically, Naktuka belonged to Indonesia, according to the agreement between Portugal and the Netherlands in 1904. In 2017, 63 families from East Timor occupied Naktuka, with immigration office, church, electric network and meeting place of the Oecusse people.

Originally the border between Amfoang and East Timor was the Noel Besi, but now the East Timor people has crossed the border up to 3 km until the stream of Nonomna. One meter from the stream is the Indonesian army outpost. This stream is claimed by East Timor as the border between Indonesia and East Timor. Indonesia wants the Noel Besi as its area according to toponym, whereas East Timor wants the Nono Nomna River based on compass azimuth.

References

Further reading 
Wheeler, T. (2004) East Timor. Footscray, VIC; Lonely Planet.

Rivers of East Timor
East Timor–Indonesia border
International rivers of Asia
Rivers of Timor
Oecusse
Rivers of West Timor
Rivers of Indonesia
Border rivers